V. Anbalagan was an Indian politician and former Member of the Legislative Assembly of Tamil Nadu. He was elected to the Tamil Nadu legislative assembly from Cheyyar constituency as a Dravida Munnetra Kazhagam candidate in 1989, and 1996 elections.

References 

Dravida Munnetra Kazhagam politicians
Living people
Year of birth missing (living people)
Tamil Nadu MLAs 1989–1991
Tamil Nadu MLAs 1996–2001